Dongshan Township is a rural township in Bama Yao Autonomous County, Guangxi Zhuang Autonomous Region, China.

Etymology
The name "Dongshan" means the east side of the Duyang Mountains.

Administrative division
As of 2017, the township is divided into 8 villages: 
 Kaqiao
 Jiangtuan
 Youya
 Nongmo
 Sanlian
 Wenqian
 Nongshan
 Changdong

Geography
The township shares a border with Donglan County to the north and northwest, Banlan Township of Dahua Yao Autonomous County to the southeast, Town to the north, and  Fenghuang Township to the southwest.

Demographics

The population of Bama, according to the 2005 census, is 10,890. There are Zhuang, Han, Yao and Maonan nationalities living here.

Economy
The main industries in and around the township are forestry and farming. The main food crops are corn, soybean and sweet potato, and the main cash crops are hemp. Breeders are mainly black goats, pigeons, black-bone chickens and Bama miniature pig. Native products include shar-pei, hook rattan, honeysuckle, ivy and so on.

References

Bibliography
 

Townships of Hechi
Divisions of Bama Yao Autonomous County